The Supermarine Swan was a 1920s British experimental amphibian aircraft built by Supermarine at Woolston, Southampton. The single aircraft that was built was used for a passenger service between England and France.

Design and development
The Supermarine Swan was designed by R. J. Mitchell, chief designer at Supermarine as an experimental wooden biplane amphibian aircraft, in parallel with the Supermarine Scylla design for a replacement for the Royal Air Force's Felixstowe F5s.

First flown on 25 March 1924 (as serial N175), the Swan was powered by two 350 hp (261 kW) Rolls-Royce Eagle IX engines. It was re-engined with two 450 hp (336 kW) Napier Lion engines and had the landing gear removed for evaluation at the Marine Aircraft Experimental Establishment in August 1924. In 1926, it was registered G-EBJY and loaned to Imperial Airways as a flying boat with accommodation for 10 passengers. It was scrapped in 1927.

Operators

 Marine Aircraft Experimental Establishment
 Imperial Airways

Specifications

See also

References

Sources

Further reading

 

1920s British military reconnaissance aircraft
Amphibious aircraft
Swan
Aircraft first flown in 1924
Twin piston-engined tractor aircraft